Anhalinine is a naturally occurring alkaloid which can be isolated from Lophophora williamsii. It is structurally related to mescaline.

See also
 Anhalamine
 Anhalidine
 Anhalonidine
 Gigantine
 Pellotine

References

Lophophora
Isoquinoline alkaloids
Norsalsolinol ethers
Pyrogallol ethers